LCLC may refer to:

 Large-cell lung carcinoma
 lateral collateral ligament complex, of the radial collateral ligament of elbow joint
 Loving Couples Loving Children, a curriculum at the Building Strong Families Program
 LaSalle Computer Learning Center of the Florida Technical College

See also

 
 LC (disambiguation)
 LC2 (disambiguation)